Musular can refer to:

 Musular, İskilip
 Musular, Şereflikoçhisar